Trailokyavijaya (Vajrayana, Japanese: Gōzanze Myō-ō; Korean: Hangsamse Myeongwang) is the King of knowledge having conquered the three worlds, one of the five kings of knowledge of Buddhism. His mission is to protect the eastern part of the world.

In general, the three worlds represent the world of desire, the world of form and the formless world; some interpret this king of knowledge is called so because he wants to defeat the supreme leader of the three worlds, Maheśvara; The most logical explanation reveals that the three worlds denote the three poisons: greed, hatred and ignorance, three trends that humans can not conquer during the past, present and future that the king hoped to help people eliminate.

Iconographic representation
The Lord Trailokyavijaya was born from the blue syllable, Hûm. He is blue, with four faces, and eight arms. His primary face expresses a love fury, the right, anger, disgust in the left, and behind, that of heroism. His main hands bear the bell and lightning, his chest says Vajra-hum-Kara; his three right hands hold (in descending order) a sword, the elephant hook, and an arrow; the three left hands hold a bow, lace, and a discus. He carries, among other adornments, a garland made of a cord of Buddhas, is being developed as identical to him, that has (according fingers) magic gesture after touching fists back to back, attach two small chain-like fingers. The formula is "Om", etc.

Mantra
The magic mantra of the King of knowledge having conquered the three worlds is:

See also

 Chinese Esoteric Buddhism
 Shingon
 Vidyaraja

References

External links

Buddhist mythology
Wisdom Kings
Wrathful deities